Colorado is a district of the Abangares canton, in the Guanacaste province of Costa Rica.

History 
Colorado was created on 24 April 1970 by Decreto 23, crea consejo distrital.

Geography 
Colorado has an area of  km² and an elevation of  metres.

Villages
Administrative center of the district is the town of Colorado.

Other villages are Barbudal, Gavilanes, Higuerilla, Huacas (partly), Monte Potrero, Quebracho, Peñablanca, San Buenaventura, San Joaquín, Solimar and Villafuerte.

Demographics 

For the 2011 census, Colorado had a population of  inhabitants.

Transportation

Road transportation 
The district is covered by the following road routes:
 National Route 18
 National Route 133
 National Route 601

References 

Districts of Guanacaste Province
Populated places in Guanacaste Province